Billposters is a 1940 Donald Duck and Goofy cartoon. It was the third Donald & Goofy cartoon produced.

Plot
Donald and Goofy have been hired to display posters, or bills, for a no name soup company. (While entering, they both gleefully sing "Whistle While You Work" from the then recently released Snow White and the Seven Dwarfs.) Goofy attempts, unsuccessfully, to paste his bills onto a nearby windmill, while Donald battles with a local farmyard goat, who's intent on eating everything it can. The battle ensues into a chase between Donald and the goat, ultimately concluding with the goat headbutting Donald and Goofy perpetually around the windmill blades.

Voice cast
 Clarence Nash as Donald Duck
 Danny Webb as Goofy

Home media
The short film was released on May 18, 2004, on Walt Disney Treasures: The Chronological Donald, Volume One: 1934-1941.

References

External links
 
 

Donald Duck short films
1940s Disney animated short films
1940 films
Goofy (Disney) short films
1940 animated films
Films directed by Clyde Geronimi
Films produced by Walt Disney